In the 2008–09 season, Partizani Tirana was again relegated from the Kategoria Superiore after eight seasons playing in that competition, after a loss in the relegation play-out against Kastrioti Krujë, in a game that was marred by poor refereeing decisions as well as violence.

First-team squad
Squad at end of season

Transfers

Summer

In:

Out:

Source:

Winter 

In:

Out:

Source:

Competitions

Kategoria Superiore

League table

Results summary

Results by round

Matches

Relegation play-offs

Albanian Cup

First round

Second round

Quarter-finals

 The tie was annulled due to both teams fielding players that previously played in the Cup for other teams. Flamurtari's Eriol Merxha played for Elbasani while Partizani's Genti Gjondedaj and Engert Bakalli played for Teuta and Elbasani, respectively. The tie was replayed with one-legged match, played on Niko Dovana Stadium in Durrës on 8 April 2009.

UEFA Cup

First qualifying round

Notes

References

External links
Official website 

Partizani
FK Partizani Tirana seasons